

The Latham 47, or Latham R3B4 in Naval service was a French twin-engine flying boat designed and built by Société Latham & Cie for the French Navy. The aircraft achieved notoriety in 1928 when aircraft number 47.02 disappeared with the explorer Roald Amundsen on a rescue mission for the Italian explorer Umberto Nobile.

Design and development
The Latham 47 was designed to meet a French Navy requirement for a long-range flying boat with a transatlantic capability. The prototype appeared in 1928, although it was lost in a fire after two flights. The Type 47 was a large biplane powered by two Farman 12We engines mounted in tandem below the upper wing. The pilot and co-pilot sat side by side in an open cockpit, two further machine gun-equipped cockpits were located in the nose and amidships. Twelve production aircraft were built and delivered to the Navy. Two further aircraft were built as the Latham 47P as civilian mail carriers with Hispano-Suiza 12Y engines. The 47Ps were used on Mediterranean routes until 1932.

Variants
Type 47.01
First Latham 47 prototype.
Type 47.02
Second Latham 47 prototype.
Type 47
Two prototypes and twelve production military aircraft, designated R3B4 in service, indicating three seat reconnaissance or four seat bomber.
Type 47P
Civilian mail carriers, two built.

Operators

French Navy
Escadrille 3E1
Escadrille 4R1

Accidents and incidents

On 6 June 1928 the Latham 47.02 was tasked to help search for the airship Italia which earlier on 25 May 1928 had crashed on pack ice in the Arctic Ocean just north of Spitsbergen. The aircraft, piloted by Norwegian Leif Dietrichson and Frenchman René Guilbaud, picked up the explorer Roald Amundsen and a colleague at Bergen. On 18 June the aircraft left Tromsø, Norway to fly across the Barents Sea; it disappeared without a trace until, on 31 August the same year, the torn-off port float was found off the coast of Troms and, in October, a large gasoline tank was found on Haltenbanken.

Specifications (Type 47)

See also

Bibliography

References

 
 

1920s French military reconnaissance aircraft
Flying boats
Latham aircraft
Biplanes
Twin-engined push-pull aircraft
Aircraft first flown in 1928